The Voronezh–Kharkov strategic offensive operation was a successful strategic offensive operation of the Red Army's Voronezh, Bryansk and South-Western fronts, carried out from January 13 to March 3, 1943 with the aim of defeating the German Army Group B and liberating a large territory and the important industrial and administrative centers Voronezh, Kursk, Belgorod and Kharkov.

Prelude 
In the winter of 1942/43, the Red Army launched several large offensives on the southern part of the Eastern Front in the wake of the Battle of Stalingrad. In late December, at the same time as the German 6th Army was increasingly enclosed in Stalingrad by the troops of Konstantin Rokossovsky, the troops of the Southwestern Front defeated the Italian 8th Army as part of the Operation Little Saturn and reached the line Novaya Kalitwa – Markovka – Volozhin – Chernikovsky.

The Stawka planned in the course of these successes a major strategic operation, which aimed at cutting off all German forces in the Caucasus, by taking Rostov-on-Don. At the same time, the Voronezh Front, in cooperation with the left wing of the Bryansk Front and the right wing of the Southwestern Front, was tasked with a strong offensive towards Voronezh and Kursk, which aimed to retake Kharkov.

The Voronezh-Kharkov strategic offensive operation had three phases:
 Ostrogozhsk–Rossosh offensive – from January 13 to January 27, 1943;
 Voronezh–Kastornoye operation – from January 24 to February 2, 1943;
 Kharkov offensive operation (operation "Star") – from February 19 to March 14, 1943.
The operation took 50 days. The width of the front of hostilities was between 250–400 km. The depth of advance of Soviet troops was between 360–520 km, or an average daily advance of 7–10 km.

Order of battle

USSR 
 Voronezh Front (Front commander – Filipp Golikov):
60th Army (Ivan Chernyakhovsky)
40th Army (Kirill Moskalenko)
69th Army (Mikhail Kazakov)
3rd Tank Army (Pavel Rybalko)
38th army (Nikandr Chibisov)
 Bryansk Front (Front commander – Max Reyter)
13th Army (Nikolai Pukhov),
 Southwestern Front (Front commander – Nikolai Vatutin) 
 6th Army (Fedor Kharitonov).

Air support  
2nd Air Army (Konstantin Smirnov)
13th Air Army (Stepan Rybalchenko)

Nazi Germany 
Army Group B (Field Marshal Maximilian von Weichs):
2nd Army (Hans von Salmuth)
VII Army Corps (Ernst-Eberhard Hell)
XIII Army Corps (Erich Straube)
LV Army Corps (Rudolf Freiherr von Roman)
4th Panzer Army (Hermann Hoth)
Italian 8th Army (Italo Gariboldi)
Hungarian 2nd Army (Gusztáv Jány)

Results 
The Voronezh-Kharkov Operation was a clear defeat for Army Group B. The 8th Italian Army and the 2nd Hungarian Army were almost completely destroyed.
Several large cities were liberated: Voronezh, Kursk, Belgorod, Kharkov, Rossosh, Valuyki, Ostrogozhsk, Kastornoye, Stary Oskol, Novy Oskol, Shchigry, Oboyan, Bogodukhov, Akhtyrka and Sevsk.

In the ensuing Third Battle of Kharkov, German troops recaptured Kharkov (March 16) and Belgorod (March 18) from the overstretched Soviet Army.

During the operation, the Soviets lost in total: 153,561 soldiers, of which 55,475 were killed and 98,086 people were wounded. Axis losses amounted to around 160,000 soldiers of which 77,000 killed (of which 49,000 were German soldiers and officers).

References

Conflicts in 1943
1943 in the Soviet Union
Battles of Kharkov
Battles of World War II involving Germany
Battles involving the Soviet Union
Battles and operations of the Soviet–German War
1943 in Ukraine
January 1943 events
February 1943 events
March 1943 events